We Begin (1987) is a collaborative album by the American jazz musicians Mark Isham and Art Lande. It is a highly experimental album featuring a wide range of compositional styles.

The first track on the album is a piece titled “The Melancholy of Departure”. It consists of a soft and mournful trumpet melody set against a harsh and almost mechanical rhythm. “The Melancholy of Departure” takes its title from a 1916 work by the Italian metaphysical painter Giorgio de Chirico.

The two most experimental tracks on the album are “Ceremony in Starlight” and “Surface and Symbol”. “Ceremony in Starlight” is an eerie avant-garde composition with muted trumpet, piano and synthesized bells. “Surface and Symbol” is a complex arrangement of looped trumpet, piano and percussion with synthesizer accompaniments.

Track listing
”The Melancholy of Departure” (Isham) – 6:32
”Ceremony in Starlight” (Isham) – 7:34
”We Begin” (Lande) – 6:19
”Lord Ananea” (Lande) – 2:42
”Surface and Symbol” (Isham, Lande) – 10:45
”Sweet Circle” (Lande) – 4:09
”Fanfare” (Lande) – 3:26

Personnel
Mark Isham – trumpet, fluegelhorn, piccolo trumpet, synthesizer, percussion
Art Lande – piano, synthesizer, percussion

Mark Isham albums
Art Lande albums
1987 albums
Albums produced by Manfred Eicher
ECM Records albums